Lise Vidal (24 November 1977 – 3 July 2021) was a French windsurfer. She competed in the 2000 Summer Olympics, finishing ninth in the Women's Mistral One Design event.

References

External links 
 
 
 
 

1977 births
2021 deaths
Sailors at the 2000 Summer Olympics – Mistral One Design
French female sailors (sport)
French windsurfers
Olympic sailors of France
Sportspeople from Marseille
20th-century French women
Female windsurfers